São Gião is a parish (freguesia in Portuguese), in the North of Portugal, on Serra da Estrela, the highest mountain range in Portugal. It belongs to the municipality of Oliveira do Hospital, and the district (distrito) of Coimbra. The population in 2011 was 425, in an area of 14.55 km².

It lies at an altitude of 704m, in the Beira region.

It is an old Roman trading post. The old Roman bridge is still visible and in use to this day (to be confirmed).

The town has a magnificent church - Igreja Matrix, also known as the Igreja Matriz de São Gião or the Catedral das Beiras. This is an excellent building in the Baroque style that dates back to 1795. It has 102 magnificent hand painted panels on the roof that are well worth the trip to this small, hidden village on the slopes of the Serra da Estrela.

Situated in the countryside between São Gião and Carvalha is the São Gião Radio Telecope. The 9.3 meter diameter radio telescope is the largest radio telescope in mainland Portugal and is used for astronomical measurements and education.

See also

 Beira
 Serra da Estrela
 São Gião Radio Telecope
 Church of São Gião

References

Freguesias of Oliveira do Hospital